Formerly in Welsh law, an amober, or amobyr, was a maiden-fee paid to a lord on the marriage of a maiden in his manor. The term is similar to the English feudal merchet.

References

"Amober". Oxford English Dictionary. Oxford University Press. Second Edition 1989.

Feudal duties
Welsh law
Legal history of Wales